Events from the year 1910 in Taiwan, Empire of Japan.

Incumbents

Central government of Japan
 Prime Minister: Katsura Tarō

Taiwan 
 Governor-General – Sakuma Samata

Events

October
 1 October – The opening of Lumachan railway station in Tainan Prefecture

December
 16 December – The opening of Shoufeng railway station in Karenkō Prefecture

Births
 22 March – Thomas Liao, activist 

 
Years of the 20th century in Taiwan